The 2010 Memorial Van Damme was the 34th edition of the annual outdoor track and field meeting in Brussels, Belgium. Held on 27 August at the King Baudouin Stadium, it was the fourteenth leg of the inaugural IAAF Diamond League – the highest level international track and field circuit – and the second half of the final for 2010 (the first half being held during the Weltklasse Zürich in Zürich, Switzerland on 18–19 August).

Diamond League champions

Records
The following records were set at the meet.

Kenyan athlete Vivian Cheruiyot also ran a world leading 14.34.13 in the women's 5000 m, the fastest time in 2010.

Diamond League results

Men

Women

Non-Diamond League results

Men

Women

See also
2010 Weltklasse Zürich (previous meet and first half of the 2010 IAAF Diamond League final)

References

Results
Results Archive Diamond League. Retrieved 20 February 2020.

External links
Official Diamond League Memorial Van Damme website

2010
Memorial Van Damme
Memorial Van Damme